Pyotr Makarchuk (born 10 July 1972) is a Russian bobsledder. He competed at the 2002 Winter Olympics and the 2006 Winter Olympics.

References

External links
 

1972 births
Living people
Russian male bobsledders
Olympic bobsledders of Russia
Bobsledders at the 2002 Winter Olympics
Bobsledders at the 2006 Winter Olympics
People from Abakan
Sportspeople from Khakassia